Thansing is a village development committee in Nuwakot District in the Bagmati Zone of central Nepal. At the time of the 1991 Nepal census it had a population of 5951 people living in 1020 individual households.

Thansing V.D.C has a government affiliated Shree Mahindra Higher secondary school.

There are many religious places to visit in Thansing:
 Jalpa Devi: A temple of the Hindu goddess Durga, also called Kali
 Mahadav Temple: a temple of Hindu holy god lord Shiva.
 Kalika devi Temple: a temple of god Kali
 Bacchala Devi Temple Likhu -6 nuwakot: a temple of god Devi and Mahadav.

References

External links 
 UN map of the municipalities of Nuwakot District

Populated places in Nuwakot District